Indian Valley is an unincorporated community in Floyd County, Virginia, United States. It used to be called Phillips. It has a post office, Floyd County Rescue Squad Station #4, Floyd County Fire Department Station #4, Indian Valley Elementary School, and a garage; Marshall's Automotive and Body Shop.

References

Unincorporated communities in Floyd County, Virginia
Unincorporated communities in Virginia